A list of notable illustrators from Slovenia:

A 
 Zvest Apollonio (1935–2009)

B 
 Milko Bambič (1905–1991)

Č 
 Zvonko Čoh (1956–)

D 
 Danijel Demšar (1954–)
 Julia Doria

G 
 Kostja Gatnik (1945–)
 Jelka Godec Schmidt (1958–)
 Ančka Gošnik Godec (1927–)

J 
 Matija Jama
 Marjanca Jemec Božič (1928–)

K 
 Božo Kos (1931–2009)

M 
 Miki Muster (1925–2018)
 Dušan Muc (1952–)

O 
 Mojca Osojnik (1970–)

R 
 Jelka Reichman (1939–)

S 
 Alenka Sottler (1958–)
 Matjaž Schmidt (1948–2010)
 Marija Lucija Stupica (1950–2002)
 Marlenka Stupica (1927–)

V 
 Kamila Volčanšek (1950–)
 Melita Vovk (1928–)

 
Illustrator